Muckanagh Lough is a freshwater lake in the Burren region of County Clare, Ireland.

Geography

Natural history
Fish species in Muckanagh Lough include brown trout, perch, rudd, pike, tench, three-spined stickleback and the critically endangered European eel. The lake is part of the East Burren Complex Special Area of Conservation.

See also
List of loughs in Ireland

References

Muckanagh